The 2015 Ryedale District Council election took place on 7 May 2015 to elect members of the Ryedale District Council in England. It was held on the same day as other local elections.

Party results

|}

The Conservative Party fielded 26 candidates for the 30 vacancies - 20 of whom were elected. There were 13 Independent candidates with 5 elected. Two Independent Groups were formed on the Council - one with the three members for Malton and one with the two members for Hovingham and Rillington. The Liberal Party fielded 10 candidates with 3 elected and the Liberal Democrats fielded 6 candidates with 2 elected.

The Green Party fielded 8 candidates, non of whom were elected. Likewise, the Labour Party fielded 7 unsuccessful candidates and the UK Independence Party fielded 6 unsuccessful candidates.

Ward results

30 Members were elected across 20 Wards.

 

 
 

 Lindsay Burr was previously elected as a Liberal Democrat and retained her seat.

References

2015 English local elections
May 2015 events in the United Kingdom
2015
2010s in North Yorkshire